Chelmsford Rural District was a local government district in Essex, England from 1894 to 1974. It surrounded, but did not include, the town of Chelmsford; which formed a municipal borough.

It was formed as a rural district in 1894, based on the Chelmsford rural sanitary district. It included the parishes of:

Boreham
Broomfield
Buttsbury
Chignal St James
Danbury
East Hanningfield
Good Easter
Great Baddow
Great Leighs
Great Waltham
Highwood
Ingatestone and Fryerning
Little Baddow
Little Leighs
Little Waltham
Margaretting
Mashbury
Pleshey
Rettendon
Roxwell
Runwell
Sandon
South Hanningfield
Springfield
Stock
West Hanningfield
Widford
Woodham Ferrers
Writtle

During 1934 there were some changes to the district boundary. The municipal borough of Chelmsford expanded and gained  from the rural district, including parts of the parishes of Broomfield, Springfield, Widford, and Writtle. At the same time  were transferred from Buttsbury parish to form part of Billericay Urban District. Also at this time  was gained from the parish of Hockley in Rochford Rural District.

The district was abolished in 1974 and its former area was merged with the municipal borough of Chelmsford to form the current non-metropolitan district of Chelmsford, which inherited the borough charter. The parishes of Ingatestone and Fryerning and Mountnessing became part of the district of Brentwood. The former council offices in New London Road are now used as a Jobcentre Plus.

References

Further reading
Pike, E., Chelmsford Rural District, Essex; Official Guide, (1971). .

Political history of Essex
Districts of England created by the Local Government Act 1894
Districts of England abolished by the Local Government Act 1972
City of Chelmsford
Rural districts of England